"Lady Lay Down' is a song written by Rafe Van Hoy and Don Cook, and recorded by American country music artist John Conlee.  It was released in October 1978 as the second single from the album Rose Colored Glasses.  The song was Conlee's second country hit and his first of seven number ones on the country chart.  The single stayed at number one for one week.

Chart performance

John Conlee

Year-end charts

Tom Jones
In 1981, Tom Jones released a single with the song, that is also featured on his album Darlin'. Jones' cover of the song charted at number 26 on the same chart.

References

1978 singles
1981 singles
1978 songs
John Conlee songs
Tom Jones (singer) songs
Songs written by Don Cook
ABC Records singles
Mercury Records singles
Songs written by Rafe Van Hoy